William Francis Ward Jr. (August 23, 1928 – June 21, 2018) was a major general in the United States Army. He was chief of the United States Army Reserve from December 1, 1986 to July 31, 1991.

References

United States Army generals
1928 births
2018 deaths